Sririta Jensen Narongdej (born 27 October 1981 in Tanjung Priok, Jakarta, Indonesia) is a Thai actress and model.

Biography
Sririta Jensen was born in 1981 in Jakarta to a Danish dad and a Chinese-Thai mom. Jensen's career began with guest roles on Thai television series. She became more well known in Thailand as a model in various national advertising campaigns and was featured on numerous magazine covers. As an actress, her feature films include 999-9999 and the Television Broadcasts Limited (Hong Kong) series, Split Second.

Filmography

Films

Television

MC
 2021 : EP1: พาดูห้อง Penthouse Diplomat 39 On Air YouTube:RITAKORN

External links

 
 Official Fansite
 sririta-jensen.com 
 Sririta Jensen on Facebook
 Biography
 SriritaJensenOfficial Facebook

1981 births
Living people
Sririta Jensen Narongdej
Sririta Jensen Narongdej
Sririta Jensen Narongdej
Sririta Jensen Narongdej
Sririta Jensen Narongdej
Sririta Jensen Narongdej
Sririta Jensen Narongdej
Sririta Jensen Narongdej
Sririta Jensen Narongdej
Sririta Jensen Narongdej
Sririta Jensen Narongdej